Towson University's College of Liberal Arts, the largest of the eight colleges at Towson, includes the departments of:
 English
 Family Studies and Human Services
 Foreign Languages
 Geography and Environmental Planning
 History
 Philosophy and Religious Studies
 Political Science*
 Psychology
 Sociology
 Anthropology
 Criminal Justice
 Women's Studies

The college additionally offers interdisciplinary degree programs in cultural studies, international studies, law and American civilization, metropolitan studies and social science. Graduate programs are offered in geography and environmental planning, humanities, liberal and professional studies, professional writing, psychology, social science, women's studies and several interdisciplinary studies programs.

External links
 College of Liberal Arts - Towson University Website

Liberal Arts
Liberal arts colleges at universities in the United States